Rafael Gargiulo (born 24 October 1936) is an Argentine boxer. He competed at the 1960 Summer Olympics and the 1964 Summer Olympics. At the 1964 Summer Olympics, he defeated Bela Istvan Horvath of Switzerland, before losing to Zbigniew Pietrzykowski of Poland.

References

1936 births
Living people
Argentine male boxers
Olympic boxers of Argentina
Boxers at the 1960 Summer Olympics
Boxers at the 1964 Summer Olympics
Boxers at the 1959 Pan American Games
Pan American Games silver medalists for Argentina
Pan American Games medalists in boxing
Boxers from Buenos Aires
Light-heavyweight boxers
Medalists at the 1959 Pan American Games